Bernard Edward Towler (13 March 1912 – 19 May 1992) was an English footballer who scored 41 goals from 90 appearances in the Football League playing for Lincoln City and Notts County. He played at outside left or inside left. His career was interrupted by the Second World War; after the war he played for Boston United for a season in the Midland League.

References

1912 births
1992 deaths
Sportspeople from Ipswich
English footballers
Association football forwards
Lincoln City F.C. players
Notts County F.C. players
Ruston Bucyrus F.C. players
Boston United F.C. players
English Football League players
Midland Football League players
Place of death missing